Biota is the fourth studio album by the free improvisation ensemble Mnemonist Orchestra, released in 1982 by Dys Records.

Track listing

Personnel 
Adapted from the Horde liner notes.

Mnemonists
 Mark Derbyshire – recorder, electronics, mastering
 Steve Emmons – tape, percussion, spoken word
 Rolf Goranson – bass guitar, tape, spoken word
 Steve Scholbe – alto saxophone, electric guitar, organ, electronics, tape, production
 William Sharp – tape, clarinet, percussion, electronic, production, mastering

Additional musicians
 Bill Burgess – percussion
 Karen Nakai – bass guitar
Production and additional personnel
 James Dixon – cover art, illustrations
 Richard Donaldson – mastering
 Tom Katsimpalis – illustrations, design

Release history

References

External links 
 Biota at Discogs (list of releases)

1982 albums
Biota (band) albums